Koshopah is an unincorporated community in Brown County, Nebraska, United States.

History
A post office was established at Koshopah in 1920, and remained in operation until it was discontinued in 1957.

References

Unincorporated communities in Brown County, Nebraska
Unincorporated communities in Nebraska